Madeline Nyamwanza-Makonese is the first Zimbabwean female doctor, the second African woman to become a doctor, and the first African woman to graduate from the University of Rhodesia Medical School. She graduated from the University of Rhodesia Medical School in 1970. Madeline's success is significant and was a huge step forward for women in Zimbabwe, where women are considered culturally unequal to men.

Background

She was the seventh child in a family of nine. She was born at St Augustine Mission, Penhalonga where her father worked at the mission farm.

False Scandal

In 2014 there was a scandal as it was alleged that Madeline's husband, Deputy board chairman Eben Makonese of the medical aid society Cimas Medical Aid Society, influenced the appointment of his unqualified brother-in-law as the group's director of medical services. An extract from the Sunday Mail dated 24 August 2014 highlighted:

CIMAS:Setting the record straight
IN OUR issue of April 20–26, 2013, we carried an article headlined "Nepotism scandal rocks Cimas".
We have since learnt that there is no basis for allegations made in the report.  We accordingly unreservedly apologise to Cimas Medical Aid Society, its former deputy chairman Mr. Eben Makonese, the managing director of its Medical Services Division Mr. Mafingei Nyamwanza, and to the other individuals named in that article, namely: Enest Samanga, Roselyn Magaramombe, Sarapia Sibanda, Sandra Mavuto and Erica Chidziva.

We regret the embarrassment it has caused to each and every one of them. - Acting Editor

References

Women physicians
Zimbabwean physicians
Year of birth missing (living people)
Living people
University of Zimbabwe alumni